Myriam Leuenberger (born 22 January 1987) is a Swiss former competitive figure skater. She is the 2014 Coupe du Printemps bronze medalist and a three-time Swiss national medalist. At the 2012 European Championships, she qualified to the final segment and finished 21st overall. The Coupe du Printemps in March 2014 was her final international competition. She was coached by Mark Pepperday and Gheorghe Chiper.

In July 2014, Leuenberger teamed up with Germany's Robin Szolkowy to perform in ice shows. In 2018, she joined the German version of Dancing on Ice, partnering Kevin Kuske.

Programs

Results

References

External links

 
 Myriam Leuenberger at Tracings.net

Figure skaters from Zürich
1987 births
Living people
Swiss female single skaters
Figure skaters at the 2007 Winter Universiade
Competitors at the 2011 Winter Universiade